Jacob Abel (born March 9, 2001) is an American racing driver who currently competes in Indy NXT for Abel Motorsports. He previously competed in the Indy Pro 2000 Championship for Abel Motorsports.

Career

Lower formulae
Abel began his senior racing career in 2017 at the age of 16, competing in the F4 United States Championship with Abel Motorsports. The following season, Abel stepped back to a partial-season schedule in both the F4 United States Championship and the new-for-2018 F3 Americas Championship. Abel would score four podiums in his opening season in F3, en route to a fourth place championship finish. He took his first win in the series early the following season, scoring back-to-back victories at Road Atlanta.

In 2023, Abel stepped outside of North America for the first time in his racing career, taking part in the 2023 Formula Regional Oceania Championship with Kiwi Motorsport.

Road to Indy
Abel made his Road to Indy debut in July 2017 at Mid-Ohio, driving for Newman Wachs Racing. After a part-time schedule in the series for 2018, Abel stepped up to the Indy Pro 2000 Championship in 2019. His opening season in the championship was quiet, as he finished 9th overall with no podiums and two top fives. He would compete in just seven races in 2020 to supplement a full-season drive in the Formula Regional Americas Championship, scoring his first Indy Pro 2000 podium at Mid-Ohio that September. For 2021, Abel committed to a full-time schedule in Indy Pro 2000. Claiming two podiums, one each at Road America and Mid-Ohio, Abel finished his first full season sixth in the standings. For 2022, Abel stepped up to Indy Lights, once again with Abel Motorsports. He finished eighth in the championship during his rookie season, finishing as high as fourth at Portland and Laguna Seca. For 2023, Abel returned to the series. He scored his first series podium in the opening race of the season at St. Petersburg, leading 27 of 40 laps before dropping to third on a late restart.

Sports cars
In March 2021, Abel was announced as part of HPD's 2021 Junior Factory Lineup. As a result, Abel would compete part-time with Racers Edge Motorsports in the GT World Challenge America. Later that season, Abel joined Compass Racing for the IMSA SportsCar Championship event at WeatherTech Raceway Laguna Seca, substituting for Jeff Kingsley. The following weekend, Abel scored his first class victory in GT3 machinery in race #1 of the GT World Challenge America event at Watkins Glen.

Stadium Super Trucks
In August 2021, Abel made his Stadium Super Trucks debut at the Music City Grand Prix, where he drove a truck sponsored by Crosley Brands. He finished runner-up in the second and final race of the weekend.

Personal life
A graduate of Trinity High School in Louisville, Abel attended college part-time at Butler University while pursuing his racing career. A marketing major, Abel stated that his education helped him understand the financial and business aspects of motorsports.

Racing record

Career summary

* Season still in progress.

American open–wheel racing results

U.S. F2000 National Championship

Indy Pro 2000 Championship

Indy NXT

*Season still in progress.

Complete IMSA SportsCar Championship results
(key) (Races in bold indicate pole position)

* Season still in progress.

Stadium Super Trucks
(key) (Bold – Pole position. Italics – Fastest qualifier. * – Most laps led.)

Complete Formula Regional Oceania Championship Results
(key) (Races in bold indicate pole position) (Races in italics indicate fastest lap)

References

External links
Jacob Abel  at the Indy Pro 2000 Championship

2001 births
Living people
American racing drivers
Racing drivers from Louisville, Kentucky
Racing drivers from Kentucky
U.S. F2000 National Championship drivers
Formula Regional Americas Championship drivers
Indy Pro 2000 Championship drivers
Indy Lights drivers
WeatherTech SportsCar Championship drivers
Stadium Super Trucks drivers
GT World Challenge America drivers
Newman Wachs Racing drivers
Toyota Racing Series drivers
United States F4 Championship drivers